Amore amaro (internationally released as Bitter Love and Renata) is a 1974 Italian drama film directed by Florestano Vancini. For this film Lisa Gastoni was awarded with a Silver Ribbon for best actress.

Plot
The film, set in the Ferrara of the 1930s, tells the story of an impossible love between a young student, Antonio Olivieri (Leonard Mann) and a thirty-five-year-old widow with children, Renata Andreoli (Lisa Gastoni). Indeed the social differences and their irreconcilable political leanings would impede the development of their relationship.

Cast
Lisa Gastoni as Renata Andreoli
Leonard Mann as  Antonio Olivieri
Rita Livesi as  Renata's mother
Germano Longo as Francesco Galli
 Maurizio Fiori as  Vittorio

References

External links

1974 films
Italian drama films
Films directed by Florestano Vancini
Films with screenplays by Suso Cecchi d'Amico
Films scored by Armando Trovajoli
1970s Italian-language films
1970s Italian films